

Football League structure
The table below shows a combination of the National League and Top Amateur football leagues which follow FIFA law of the game according to the level of play.

Current System

National Leagues

Singapore Premier League

The Singapore Premier League, formerly known as the S.League is a professional football league organised by Football Association of Singapore. The league was formed in 1996, replacing the semi-professional FAS Premier League and became the nation top-tier league. The League is played by 9 professional football clubs based in Singapore whereby there are 3 rounds for each club to play against each other. Hence every club in the league will play a total of 24 games upon the completion of each season. Hence this will be a total of 108 matches and the season last from March to October. However it was postpone after starting a few matches in 2020 due to Coronavirus cases in Singapore. The origin of the SPL can be traced back to 1921 whereby a representative club of Singapore, known as the Singapore Lions took part in the Malaysia Cup and winning the title for 24 times. Eventually the FAS and the FAM went into a dispute which eventually lead the lions from withdrawing from an FAM sanctioned tournament. This then slowly lead to the formation of FAS premier league and eventually the S.League, now known as the Singapore Premier League.  When the S.League was formed, there were 8 clubs which took part in the inaugural season. Geylang United won the first ever S.League title upon defeating the SAFFC  in a stadium filled up 30,000 crowd which remains a record breaking number of attendance to this day.

Singapore Football League

The Singapore Football League (SFL), Formerly known as the National Football League is a top amateur football tournament founded in 1975. The league is contested by football clubs that are affiliated with the Football Association of Singapore. The SFL consists of 2 divisions, Division 1 and Division 2 with relegation and promotion apply between these divisions. The SFL, then known as the NFL used to consists of 3 divisions until 2014 when the NFL Division 3 was folded. The SFL Division 1 was a top-tier football league in Singapore since its inception in 1975, succeeding the Singapore Amateur Football Association 1st Division football league. The SFL Division 1 continues to be top domestic league of the nation until the introduction of the semi-professional tournament, FAS Premier League in 1988 which eventually folded in 1996 upon the introduction of the professional S.League, now known as the SPL. The domestic cup competition for the SFL clubs is the Singapore FA Cupwhereby the clubs compete with the IWL clubs in a knock-out format competition. The SFL also served as a path for amateur and semi professional football to get into a professional path and at the same time for professional player from S.League to continue playing football at a highly competitive level upon their professional contract expiration from the SPL.

Division 1

Division 2

Division 3

Singapore Island Wide League
The Singapore Island Wide League, IWL is a qualification tournament for clubs that are associated with the FAS to get into Singapore Football League, SFL the following year.

5-a-side/Futsal Leagues 
There are currently no professional futsal leagues in Singapore. However over the years many private organisation have organised both amateur and social futsal tournament. The amateur five-a-side leagues in Singapore have their own separate oraganiers and they are not put together in a pyramid. Each league consists of at least one division. Futsal players who played in one of the leagues are eligible to participate in another league of different organisation as long as they are not full time Singapore Premier League players. Most of the amateur five-a-side leagues allowed Singapore Football League players to participate in their league, thus enhancing the league standard and quality of play. All the five-a-side leagues are based in one location and most of the league do not share the pitches. The current premier Amateur five-a-side leagues are organised by ESPZEN and D2D and they are the Sahara International Futsal League, Arena Futsal League and ESPZEN Futsal League. ESPZEN and D2D five-a-side leagues are currently the most systematic and well-organised with the highest quality of 5v5 play in Singapore and consist of mainly too amateur futsal clubs to social football teams.Some of the well known and successful 5-a-side football clubs and futsal clubs in Singapore are Sunrise FC, Dorset Boys FC, ProFutsal Club and King Albert Park FC. As of March 2020, there are no current specific Futsal league ongoing be it in professional or amateur level though there have been a National Futsal Tournament in the past.

COVID-19 pandemic
As the COVID-19 pandemic hit Singapore, the nation went through lockdown and several reopening phases. During the phase 3 of the reopening process, a group of 8 people is allowed in each respective social gathering. Hence a 4v4 tournaments were permitted by the government for non-professional footballers. Several amateur football organization have started to organize the leagues and cups tournaments in a 4v4 format. The well-known and most competitive 4v4 tournaments whereby most of the Singapore National Football League and top amateur players' involvement are D2D Arena 4v4 Futsal League and Total Pro Football Arena 4v4 League. The Total Pro Football organisation is also organising a 4v4 Premier League Division 1 and 2 that is set to commence in June with Price money and respective trophies and medals to be given for the winners and runners-up. The FAS is also planning to organise a tournament for the affiliated clubs' players and coaches to participate in a 4v4 Singapore Football League whereby there will be no price money given to the winners of the respective tournament whereby there used to be price money winners in the past prior to the pandemic.

Beach Soccer
As of March 2020, there are no beach soccer league ongoing however there have been an annual Beach Soccer competition known as Singapore Beach Soccer National Championship organised by Pro-am Beach Soccer. The latest edition was held on 2018 at Sentosa Island.

7-a-side Leagues
There are currently no professional 7-a-side football league in Singapore. However ESPZEN, a football organisation associated with Football Association of Singapore have organised a well structured 7-a-side midweek league that currently consists of 2 divisions and will be expanded to 3 divisions the next season after the COVID-19 cases. Many top 7-a-side players have taken part in the tournament and one of the well known player was Nagarajan suppiah of Senkang Rangers who played for Singapore national minifootball team in 2019 WMF World Cup. The top teams of the league since it began in 2018 are FC Singapore Pacific, Honey Badgers FC, Senkang Rangers and FC Dynamo Raptors. FC Dynamo Raptors currently also became the first team to win two consecutive seasons in Season 2 and Season 3 while Senkang Warriors became the first team to be a runner-up in two consecutive seasons in Season 1 and Season 2. Nagarajan suppiah of Senkang Rangers hold the most record of goals Scored in season 1 with 49 goals and also a total number of goal scored from Season 1 to Season 2 with 92 goals. The league is expanding and ESPZEN is in discussion to have an affiliation with a 7-a-side global football organisation IFA7 that is affiliated with FIFA or another organisation FIF7. The Stranger Soccer is another football organisation that is independent and not affiliated with the Football Association of Singapore that is currently running a 7-a-side football league started in September 2019. The league now has 1 division and they are looking to expand the league in the near future.

References

External links 
Football Association of Singapore

Football in Singapore